The Conair Firecat is a fire-fighting aircraft developed in Canada in the 1970s by modifying military surplus Grumman S-2 Trackers. The modifications were developed by the maintenance arm of the Conair Group, which became a separate company called Cascade Aerospace.

Development
The Firecats are retrofitted Grumman S-2 Trackers. Conair bought a large number of Trackers formerly operated by the Canadian Navy and a small number of ex-United States Navy aircraft as well. The Trackers are modified for aerial firefighting as Firecats by raising the cabin floor by 20 cm (8 in) and fitting a 3,296-litre (870 U.S. gal) retardant tank where the torpedo bay is normally located. All superfluous military equipment is removed and the empty weight is almost 1,500 kg lower than a Tracker's. The first aircraft was modified in 1978. Some examples have been re-engined with turboprop engines and are known as Turbo Firecats, these feature a larger tank and extra underwing fuel tanks; the Maximum Take Off Weight (MTOW) is increased by 680 kg (1,500 lb) to 12,480 kg (27,500 lb), while the lighter turbine engines also reduce the empty weight. The first Turbo Firecat was produced in 1988.

Operational history

Conair commenced Firecat operations in 1978. Firecats and Turbo Firecats were previously in service with Conair and the Government of Saskatchewan in Canada and were also used by the Government of Ontario. The Sécurité Civile organisation in France took delivery of 14 Firecats over a period of five years commencing in May 1982. It has had its examples further converted and is now standardized on the Turbo Firecat. A total of 35 Firecat and Turbo Firecat conversions have been performed; four Firecats and three Turbo Firecats have crashed in France. In 2020 Turbo Firecats were retired for Sécurité Civile in France. 

Similar conversions are performed by another company Marsh Aviation in the United States. These are known as Marsh Turbo Trackers and feature Garrett AiResearch TPE-331 turboprop engines.

Variants
Firecat Original version, fitted with Wright R-1820 radial piston engines as fitted to standard Grumman Trackers

Turbo Firecat Version fitted with two Pratt & Whitney Canada PT6A-67AF turboprop engines

Aircraft on display
Canadian Museum of Flight, Langley, British Columbia
Canadian Bushplane Heritage Centre, Sault Ste. Marie, Ontario
Reynolds-Alberta Museum, Wetaskiwin, Alberta

Specifications (Turbo Firecat)

See also

References

 
 
 Manufacturer's website

External links

Tracker, Firecat and Turbo Firecat History and Photos (in French)

1970s Canadian special-purpose aircraft
Firecat
Grumman aircraft
Aerial firefighting aircraft
Twin piston-engined tractor aircraft
High-wing aircraft
Twin-turboprop tractor aircraft
Aircraft first flown in 1978
Aircraft first flown in 1988